Tommy Brandt (born March 1, 1965) is an American multi-award-winning Christian country music artist based out of Sebring, Florida.

Born, Tommy Brandt Livingston in Lebanon, Indiana, Brandt's father was a carpenter who owned and operated a bar in Lebanon. His father later sold the bar and moved the family to Florida.

Music career
Brandt started his music career at the age of eighteen as a sound engineer for a local country band. He began writing songs and learning to play the guitar. After the lead singer left the group, Brandt volunteered to fill in until they could find a suitable replacement. After time Brandt became the permanent lead singer for the band "New South" in which he penned the song, Why, Why, Why which gave the band their first charting song. Brandt started his solo career in 1998 when he met his wife Michelle.

Performances
Brandt has performed with several artists such as Keith Urban, Miranda Lambert, Daryl Worley, Little Big Town, Porter Wagoner and Roy Clark. In Christian music he performed with Guy Penrod, Del Way, Jason Crabb, Point of Grace, Chonda Pierce and Josh Turner.

Television appearances

Brandt has appeared on GAC, CMT, GMC, Sky Angel, Cornerstone Television, TCT Network and many more. He also serves as guest host on occasion for Cowboy Church on the RFD network.

Awards
Brandt has won 29 major Christian music awards; has had 14 No. 1 songs on the Inspirational Country Music charts.
{| class="wikitable"
|-
| Year || Award || Organization
|-
| 2004  || New Artist of the Year || CMA/ICM Awards 
|-
| 2005 || Male Vocalist of the Year|| CGC Choice Awards
|-
| 2006 || Male Vocalist of the Year || CMA/ICM Awards
|-
| 2006 || Male Vocalist of the Year' || CGC Awards
|-
| 2006 || Duet of the Year || Agape Fest
|-
| 2006 || Male Vocalist of the Year || Agape Fest
|-
| 2006 || Entertainer of the Year || Agape Fest
|-
| 2007 || Entertainer of the Year || Agape Fest
|-
| 2008 || Male Vocalist of the Year || CMA/ICM Awards
|-
| 2008 || Male Vocalist of the Year || Agape Fest
|-
| 2009 || Entertainer of the Year || Agape Fest
|-
| 2009 || Male Vocalist of the Year || Agape Fest
|-
| 2009 || Song of the Year || Agape Fest
|-
| 2009 || Male Vocalist of the Year || International Country Gospel Music Association
|-
| 2009 || Male Vocalist of the Year || CMA/ICM Awards
|-
| 2010 || Producer of the Year || Agape Fest
|-
| 2010 || Male Vocalist of the Year || CCMA/ICM Awards
|- 
| 2011 || Male Vocalist of the Year || Agape Fest
|-
| 2011 || Producer of the Year || Agape Fest
|-
| 2011 || Entertainer of the Year || Agape Fest
|-
| 2012 || Special Events Project of the Year (Faith Family & Country Tour) || Artists Music Guild Heritage Award
|-
| 2012 || Mainstream Artist of the Year || Artists Music Guild Heritage Award
|-
| 2012 || Male Vocalist of the Year || Artists Music Guild Heritage Award
|-
| 2012 || Music Evangelist of the Year || CCMA/ICM Awards
|-
| 2013 || Male Vocalist of the Year || CCMA/ICM Awards
|-
| 2013 || Mainstream Artist of the Year || Artists Music Guild Heritage Award
|-
|}

 Business life 

Brandt and his wife own a company called, "Cowboy Outreach America''" which provides clean family entertainment for rodeos and other sporting events. www.cowboyoutreachamerica.org

References

1965 births
Living people
Christian writers
American country singer-songwriters
Composers of Christian music
American performers of Christian music
People from Lebanon, Indiana
People from Sebring, Florida
Singer-songwriters from Florida
Country musicians from Florida
Country musicians from Indiana
Singer-songwriters from Indiana